John Killick (born 1942), is an Australian criminal and author. He is best known for escaping from Sydney's Silverwater Jail with his partner by helicopter on 25 March 1999.

Background
Killick has spent more than 30 years in jail, first going to jail in 1960. He started robbing banks in Sydney in 1966 to pay gambling debts, becoming Australia's first decimal currency bank robber when he held up the Canley Heights ANZ bank on 14 February.

In what was called the "Perfect Alibi case", Killick was convicted of a bank robbery in Adelaide on the same day he was reporting to a police station in Sydney as part of his bail conditions.

On 25 March 1999, Killick's then-girlfriend Lucy Dudko, armed with an inoperable Thompson submachine gun, hijacked a helicopter which was conducting a tour of the Olympic Park site in the lead up to the 2000 Summer Olympics in Sydney. She forced the pilot to land in the nearby Silverwater Jail and pick up Killick who was waiting in the exercise yard. The duo were on the run for 45 days before being captured by police.

Publishing
While in jail, Killick took to writing and has authored three books about his life: Gambling For Love, The Last Escape, and On The Inside. Australian geologist Ian Plimer encouraged and assisted his writing career.

Killick has expressed remorse about his crimes.

In popular culture
John Kerr wrote the story of the 1999 prison escape in the 2003 book Wanted: John & Lucy: Rescue by Force, Silverwater Prison, 25 March 1999.

The 2015 single "Long Loud Hours" by Australian hip hop musician Urthboy tells the story of the 1999 escape, viewed from Dudko's perspective.

Appeared on ABC TV "You Can't Ask That: Ex-Prisoners" in 2015.

See also
List of helicopter prison escapes

References

Living people
1942 births
20th-century Australian criminals
Australian male writers
Australian non-fiction crime writers